This article displays the rosters for the participating teams at the 2005 FIBA Africa Club Championship.

Abidjan Basket Club

BACK

Inter Club Brazzaville

Interclube

Petro Atlético

Primeiro de Agosto

Union Bank

References

External links
 2005 FIBA Africa Champions Cup Participating Teams

FIBA Africa Clubs Champions Cup squads
Basketball teams in Africa
FIBA